Philip Martin Whitman is an American mathematician who contributed to lattice theory, particularly the theory of free lattices.

Living in Pittsburgh, he attended the Haverford College, where he earned a corporation scholarship for 1936–37, and a Clementine Cope fellowship for 1937–38, and was awarded highest honors in mathematical astronomy in 1937. He was elected to the college's chapter of the Phi Beta Kappa Society. In June 1937, he was conferred the Bachelor of science degree from Haverford. According to Garrett Birkhoff, Whitman was an undergraduate Harvard student in 1937, and an outstanding graduate student not later than 1940, one of the first who taught elementary courses to freshmen in the mathematics department. In 1938 he earned his AM, and in June 1941 he obtained his Ph.D. degree from Harvard University. He was a member of the AMS not later than 1947, and was awarded an AMS honorary membership not later than 1995.

Selected publications

References
 
 Haverford College Bulletin, Vol. 35–36, 1936–1938

External links
 

Lattice theorists
20th-century American mathematicians
Fellows of the American Mathematical Society
Haverford College alumni
Harvard University alumni